Solenysa is a genus of Asian sheet weavers that was first described by Eugène Louis Simon in 1894.

Species
 it contains fifteen species, found in Japan, China, Taiwan, and Korea:
Solenysa geumoensis Seo, 1996 – Korea
Solenysa lanyuensis Tu, 2011 – Taiwan
Solenysa longqiensis Li & Song, 1992 – China, Taiwan
Solenysa macrodonta Wang, Ono & Tu, 2015 – Japan
Solenysa mellotteei Simon, 1894 (type) – Japan
Solenysa ogatai Ono, 2011 – Japan
Solenysa partibilis Tu, Ono & Li, 2007 – Japan
Solenysa protrudens Gao, Zhu & Sha, 1993 – China
Solenysa reflexilis Tu, Ono & Li, 2007 – Japan
Solenysa retractilis Tu, 2011 – China
Solenysa spiralis Tian & Tu, 2018 – China
Solenysa tianmushana Tu, 2011 – China
Solenysa trunciformis Wang, Ono & Tu, 2015 – Japan
Solenysa wulingensis Li & Song, 1992 – China
Solenysa yangmingshana Tu, 2011 – Taiwan

See also
 List of Linyphiidae species (Q–Z)

References

Araneomorphae genera
Linyphiidae
Spiders of Asia